The eleventh season of Let's Dance started on March 9, 2018. Daniel Hartwich returned as host but Sylvie Meis was replaced by Victoria Swarovski who won Let's Dance in 2016. Motsi Mabuse, Joachim Llambi and Jorge Gonzalez also returned as the judges.

Couples

Scoring chart

Red numbers indicates the lowest score for each week.
Green numbers indicates the highest score for each week.
 indicates the couple eliminated that week.
 indicates the returning couple that finished in the bottom two.
 indicates the couple which was immune from elimination.
 indicates the couple that withdrew from the competition.
 indicates the couple was eliminated but later returned to the competition.
 indicates the winning couple.
 indicates the runner-up couple.
 indicates the third-place couple.

Averages 
This table only counts for dances scored on a traditional 30-points scale.

Highest and lowest scoring performances 
The best and worst performances in each dance according to the judges' marks are as follows:

Couples' Highest and lowest scoring performances
According to the traditional 30-point scale.

Weekly scores and songs

Launch show
For the second time there was a launch show in which each celebrity meets his partner. This show will be aired on 9 March 2018. In this first live show the couples then danced in groups and each couple got points by the judges and the viewers. At the end of the show the couple with the highest combined points was granted immunity from the first elimination. Judith Williams won immunity from the first elimination.

The Team dances

Week 1 
 Judith Williams was immune from elimination after earning it in the launch show.
 Each couple reprised the dance the celebrity danced during the launch show.
Running order

Week 2: 80's 
Running order

Week 3 
 The show was aired on April 6 because of the Easter holidays.
Running order

Week 4: 90's
 Due to a death in her family, Barbara didn't perform that week

Running order

Week 5: 2000's

Running order

Week 6
 Jimi Blue Ochsenknecht had to withdraw from the show because he broke his foot. Barbara Meier returned after being eliminated.
 Bela Klentze had to dance with Marta Arndt this week because Oana Nechiti was injured.

Running order

Week 7: TV Melodies

Running order

Week 8: Discofox

Running order

Week 9: Magic Moments
 Bela Klentze had to withdraw from the show because of his knee's injury. Iris Mareike Steen returned after being eliminated.

Running order

Week 10: Flower Power Fusion

Running order

Week 11: Semifinal

Running order

Week 12: Final

Running order

Dance chart
 Highest scoring dance
 Lowest scoring dance
 Did not scored (encore performance in the finale)
 The pair did not perform this week
 Withdrew from the competition

Notes

References

External links
Official website

Let's Dance (German TV series)
2018 German television seasons